American Exit is a 2019 American adventure drama thriller film written and directed by Tim McCann and Ingo Vollkammer and starring Dane Cook and Levi Miller.

Cast
Dane Cook as Charlie
Levi Miller as Leo
Udo Kier as Anton
Claire van der Boom as Sofia
Sebastian Sozzi as Gemini
James Kwong as Body builder

References

External links
 

2019 films
2010s adventure thriller films
2019 thriller drama films
American adventure thriller films
American thriller drama films
2010s English-language films
2010s American films